The Kaso River or Cikaso River may refer to:

 Kaso River, Borneo
 Kaso River (Sukabumi), Java. Indonesia.
 Kaso River (Garut), Java, Indonesia.

See also 
 Kaso (disambiguation)